Kyung-hwan, also spelled Kyoung-hwan or Kyung-hwan, is a Korean masculine given name. Its meaning differs based on the hanja used to write each syllable of the name. There are 54 hanja with the reading "kyung" and 21 hanja with the reading "hwan" on the South Korean government's official list of hanja which may be registered for use in given names.

People with this name include:
Choi Kyoung-hwan (born 1955), South Korean politician
Park Kyung-hwan (born 1976), South Korean footballer
Heo Kyung-hwan (born 1981), South Korean comedian
Joe Kyong-fan (born 1982), South Korean swimmer
Lee Kyung-hwan (1988–2012), South Korean footballer
Pyon Kyong-hwan, North Korean politician elected in the 2014 North Korean parliamentary election
Jeong Gyeong-hwan, screen name MaRin, South Korean League of Legends player

See also
List of Korean given names

References

Korean masculine given names